People Say may refer to:

People Say (album), by Christian Falk
"People Say" (song), by the Dixie Cups
"People Say", a song by Don Diablo from Future
"People Say", a song by The Meters from Rejuvenation
"People Say", a song by Portugal. The Man from The Satanic Satanist
"People Say", a song by Wu-Tang Clan from The Saga Continues